During World War II, Operation Newton was a  jeep-mounted patrol by 57 French members of the Special Air Service who operated in the Champagne-Burgundy area from 19 August to 11 September 1944. 

The team harassed the retreating Germans until relieved by the advancing Americans.

Conflicts in 1944
Western European Campaign (1944–1945)
Special Air Service
1944 in France
World War II British Commando raids